Sam Henshaw Ibiam (4 April 1925 – 2 December 2015), popularly known as The Black Magnet during his playing days, was a Nigerian footballer who played as a goalkeeper for the pioneer Nigerian national football team who were regarded as the "1949 UK Tourists". It is claimed that he conceded just five goals in his nine years of representing Nigeria till he retired from international football in 1958.

Playing career
Sam Ibiam's career came to limelight after featuring for the Port Harcourt XI team that got to the semi-finals of the old Governor's Cup from 1947 to 1949, thus leading to his call-up to represent Nigeria in the tour of the United Kingdom. In recognition of his achievements, Sam Ibiam was awarded a trophy at the "First National Sports Award for Sports Heroes and Heroines of Yesteryear" in 1987.

Coaching career
After his retirement from football in 1960, Sam served as head coach for the Aba XI team before proceeding to handle the Nigerian Broadcasting Corporation team from 1965 to 1967.

Honours

International
 Jalco Cup – 1958

Death
Sam died on December 2, 2015 at his residence in Ebonyi State, Nigeria.

References

1925 births
Nigerian footballers
2015 deaths
Association football goalkeepers
Nigeria international footballers